Angry Birds Go! is a kart racing game and the eighth game in the Angry Birds video game series. The game was co-developed by Rovio Entertainment and Exient Entertainment, and was released on November 15, 2013. The game was compatible with Hasbro Telepods that will allow the player to summon a specific kart. The game's tracks are located on the 3D-rendered Piggy Island. The game also featured upgradable karts and unique powers for each character.

As of October 2015, Angry Birds Go! has been downloaded over 100 million times. The game stopped receiving major updates from Rovio in 2018, and was removed from the App Store and Google Play in 2019.

Gameplay
In Angry Birds Go!, players can choose how they want to move their kart. If players choose "tilt", they must the tilt the device into the direction they want the kart to move into. If players choose "touch", players must then tap on either the left or right part of the screen to move the kart to the left or right respectively. To start the race, they must pull the kart back from a large slingshot, then release when the "GO!" text appears. If players release it early, all other opponents will also launch early, but the player's kart will spin, slowing it down. Players can collect coins, which resemble Red, the first playable character, while racing. Players can also use a character's special power, depending on the bird or pig they selected to race. But instead of collecting it on the track, they charge up, and be reusable in a race for three gems. The races, however, has no laps whatsoever and when finished with the race one energy unit, originally shown as cupcakes, is lost and is slowly regained with time. 
When players are not racing, they may use the collected coins to upgrade their kart. This feature is essential on progressing for certain race types may only be repeated if a kart's CC or "Cake Capacity" is high enough, which can be increased by upgrading. Players can also change characters when not racing, for each character has their own unique special power, that can greatly help players on certain race types, and most importantly if the chosen racer is out of energy.

Gems are an in-game currency that is either purchased with real money or slowly gained by competing races. This may be used to buy additional karts.

The July 2015 update added Formula One driver Ayrton Senna to the character roster, he is similar to Chuck and is playable permanently. The update also came with a way to earn Senna's racing helmet in-game by placing in 41 races with Senna; this is the number of races won during Senna's career.  In the 2.0 update he is no longer playable, effectively being removed from the game.

In June 2016, the game was controversially overhauled to version 2.0. Players can race (or visit an ad every few hours) to earn tickets, which can be redeemed to open treasure chests containing coins, gems, and parts. The parts can be used to upgrade karts. Energy was still used to initiate races and is now shared across all characters and recharges with time, watching ads, and/or spending gems.

Race types
There are different types of racing for each of the courses:
 Race is a downhill race against up to seven other opponents.
 Time Boom is a solo challenge where you have to reach the finish before the timer runs out, while also avoiding obstacles.
 Fruit Splat is either solo or against up to two other racers where you have to hit a set number of fruits. After the fruit meter is emptied, the fruits change to coins. On the Sub Zero course, it is called "Ice Splat", where the fruits are replaced by ice cream sandwiches and related frozen sweet treats. During October 2015, the fruits were replaced by pumpkins in all maps. They were replaced again in November 2015 with Christmas Cookies.
 Versus is against another racer with Easy, Medium and Hard option to choose for vary of difficulty or coins earned when won. This was removed in the 2.0 update.
 Champion Chase is a head-to-head race against a new racer; after three wins you will unlock the racer. In 2.0, you only need to win once to unlock the new racer.
 Slalom (only in Sub Zero and Weekly Tournament) is a race type involves driving through gates in a certain amount of time. Every time you miss a gate, a portion of time is taken off the clock and 5 TNT crates drop in front of your kart. In the Sub Zero track, this replaced the Champion Chase levels. This was removed in the 2.0 update.

In version 1.0, for Race, Time Boom and Fruit Splat races, these can only be played for five rounds with increase in difficulty until all five rounds each are completed, and then players can complete challenges. Each race type except "Versus" has a CC (Cake Capacity, earned from getting upgrades) requirement before you can enter that race type each time. In addition, there is a Jenga mode unlocked either by entering a code from the Angry Birds Jenga toy or with an in-app purchase; this has the racer going down a ramp to smash into blocks and pigs.

In version 2.0, Race, Time Boom, and Fruit Splat are the main types of racing. Versus available against Boss characters.

Development
On 12 June 2013, developer Rovio Entertainment posted a teaser trailer website showing the Red Bird speeding into the distance after a "Ready, Set, Go" countdown. The teaser fueled speculation by journalists and fans that the game would be either a racing game or an endless running game. Rovio decided the kart racing was a good fit due to supply and demand - there were calls on various forums for a mobile karting game.

Angry Birds Go! was one of the first apps released simultaneously on the four major smartphone platforms: iOS, Android, Windows Phone and BlackBerry 10. This app supports Rovio accounts so players can sync progress between different devices on the same operating system.

In version 2.0, the game was completely redesigned with a new chapter structure. Races can be replayed although rewards for each challenge are given only once. Daily challenges and tournaments involving a selection of active online players trying to accumulate points in a limited time enable players to win tickets, which can be redeemed for upgrade parts, coins, and gems. Coins can also be used to buy upgrade parts.

Telepods
Telepods are figures created by Hasbro that was first used for Angry Birds Star Wars II. It allows you to summon a specific kart, but not the specific racer shown on the toy. The summoned kart works in any track, but not all the karts can be played in every track. If a kart of a locked course is summoned, it will unlock the course, but the only playable race type is the "Versus" mode of the first track. When using Telepods, to summon the specific kart it is necessary to scan the QR code each time after the app is fully closed.

Multiplayer
Rovio announced on December 13, 2013 that the multiplayer feature will be included in the upcoming Spring 2014 update. After the release of the May 2014 update, multiplayer was partially featured as a "Weekly Tournament", where the player tries to compete in five events against the player's Facebook friends, similar to Angry Birds Friends.

In the July 2014 update, multiplayer was further added within the game. According to Rovio, this is part one of the update. The online multiplayer is asynchronous, thus players are not competing with each other at the same time. However, Rovio hints that part two of their update may contain synchronous online racing. In the November 2014 update, multiplayer features team racing with 3 other racers at the same time, and night racing is an option. In early 2015 update, local multiplayer where players can race each other if they are all using the same Wi-Fi network. It was removed in the 1.13.9 update then re-added in the 2.0 update. Then somehow in 2017, the same year that Rovio closed down production, the tournament game mode stopped working, likely having shut down.

Reception

The game has received mixed reviews, with a Metacritic score of 60/100 based on 24 reviews. The Guardian liked the gameplay and was not overly bothered by the in-app purchases. Tech2 did not like the energy system, which only allows you to play five races with a bird, after which they are locked unless you wait or unlock with crystals (which are slowly earned in-game or with an in-app purchase) and did not like the vehicle upgrade process using in-game currency that is slowly earned by racing or with an in-app purchase for coins.

References

External links

Website from Rovio

2013 video games
Android (operating system) games
Go!
Delisted digital-only games
Inactive multiplayer online games
IOS games
Kart racing video games
Video games developed in Finland
Windows Phone games
BlackBerry 10 games
Free-to-play video games
Rovio Entertainment games
Cultural depictions of Ayrton Senna
Exient Entertainment games
Multiplayer and single-player video games
Products and services discontinued in 2019